The 27th Toronto International Film Festival ran from September 5 to September 17 and screened 343 films from 50 countries.  Of these 263 were feature films, of which 141 were in a language other than English. The ten-day festival opened with Atom Egoyan's Ararat and closed with Brian De Palma's Femme Fatale.

Awards

Programmes

Gala Presentations
 11'9"01 September 11 by Youssef Chahine, Amos Gitai, Shōhei Imamura, Alejandro González Iñárritu, Claude Lelouch, Ken Loach, Samira Makhmalbaf, Mira Nair, Idrissa Ouedraogo, Sean Penn and Danis Tanović
 Antwone Fisher by Denzel Washington
 Ararat by Atom Egoyan
 Chihwaseon by Im Kwon-taek
 Far From Heaven by Todd Haynes
 Femme Fatale by Brian De Palma
 The Four Feathers by Shekhar Kapur
 Frida by Julie Taymor
 The Good Thief by Neil Jordan
 The Guys by Jim Simpson
 L'homme du train by Patrice Leconte
 In America by Jim Sheridan
 Jet Lag by Danièle Thompson
 Moonlight Mile by Brad Silberling
 The Other Side of the Bed by Emilio Martínez Lázaro
 Phone Booth by Joel Schumacher
 Spider by David Cronenberg
 White Oleander by Peter Kosminsky

Masters
 10 by Abbas Kiarostami
 All or Nothing by Mike Leigh
 La Dernière Lettre by Frederick Wiseman
 Dirty Pretty Things by Stephen Frears
 The Man Without a Past by Aki Kaurismäki
 My Mother's Smile by Marco Bellocchio
 A Peck on the Cheek by Mani Ratnam
 Sex Is Comedy by Catherine Breillat
 Shadow Kill by Adoor Gopalakrishnan
 Sweet Sixteen by Ken Loach
 A Tale Of A Naughty Girl by Buddhadev Dasgupta
 Ten Minutes Older: The Cello by Bernardo Bertolucci, Claire Denis, Mike Figgis, Jean-Luc Godard, Jiří Menzel, Michael Radford, Volker Schlöndorff and István Szabó
 Together by Chen Kaige

Visions
 Blissfully Yours by Apichatpong Weerasethakul
 City Of God by Fernando Meirelles
 Dolls by Takeshi Kitano
 Le Fils by Jean-Pierre Dardenne and Luc Dardenne
 Gerry by Gus Van Sant
 Happy Here and Now by Michael Almereyda
 Irreversible by Gaspar Noé
 Japón by Carlos Reygadas
 Ken Park by Larry Clark and Edward Lachman
 Lilya 4-ever by Lukas Moodysson
 Morvern Callar by Lynne Ramsay
 Music for Weddings and Funerals by Unni Straume
 Novo by Jean-Pierre Limosin
 Personal Velocity by Rebecca Miller
 Public Toilet by Fruit Chan
 Russian Ark by Alexandr Sokurov
 A Snake of June by Shinya Tsukamoto
 Teknolust by Lynn Hershman Leeson
 La Trilogie: Après la vie by Lucas Belvaux
 La Trilogie: Cavale by Lucas Belvaux
 La Trilogie: Un couple épatant by Lucas Belvaux
 Vendredi soir by Claire Denis
 La Vie Nouvelle by Philippe Grandrieux
 A World Of Love by Aurelio Grimaldi

Special Presentations
 8 Women by François Ozon
 8 Mile by Curtis Hanson
 Adolphe by Benoît Jacquot
 Assassination Tango by Robert Duvall
 Auto Focus by Paul Schrader
 Between Strangers by Edoardo Ponti
 Bowling for Columbine by Michael Moore
 Chaos and Desire by Manon Briand
 City of Ghosts by Matt Dillon
 Dirty Deeds by David Caesar
 Divine Intervention by Elia Suleiman
 The Emperor's Club by Michael Hoffman
 Evelyn by Bruce Beresford
 Heaven by Tom Tykwer
 I've Heard the Mermaids Singing by Patricia Rozema
 Laurel Canyon by Lisa Cholodenko
 Max by Menno Meyjes
 Miyazaki's Spirited Away by Hayao Miyazaki
 Punch-Drunk Love by Paul Thomas Anderson
 The Quiet American by Phillip Noyce
 Rabbit-Proof Fence by Phillip Noyce
 The Secret Lives of Dentists by Alan Rudolph
 Shaolin Soccer by Stephen Chow
 Standing in the Shadows of Motown by Paul Justman
 Tso Chaplin Mutual Shorts: Easy Street; The Cure; The Adventurer by Charles Chaplin
 Talk to Her by Pedro Almodóvar
 Touching Wild Horses by Eleanore Lindo
 The Wild Thornberrys Movie by Jeff McGrath and Cathy Malkasian

Dialogues: Talking with Pictures
 Billy Jack by Tom Laughlin
 The Conversation by Francis Ford Coppola
 Days of Heaven by Terrence Malick
 Modern Times by Charles Chaplin
 Outcast of the Islands by Carol Reed
 Pickpocket by Robert Bresson

Discovery
 Bellissima by Artur Urbanski
 Chicken Poets by Meng Jinghui
 Les Diables by Christophe Ruggia
 The Exam by Nasser Refaie
 Hard Goodbyes: My Father by Penny Panayotopoulou
 Hukkle by Gyorgy Palfi
 The Last Great Wilderness by David Mackenzie
 Leo by Mehdi Norowzian
 Letters in the Wind by Ali Reza Amini
 The Magdalene Sisters by Peter Mullan
 Try Seventeen by Jeffrey Porter
 Whale Rider by Niki Caro
 Woman Of Water by Hidenori Sugimori
 Women's Prison by Manijeh Hekmat
 Blue by Hiroshi Ando

Real to Reel
 Atlantic Drift by Michel Daeron
 Blind Spot: Hitler's Secretary by André Heller and Othmar Schmiderer
 Cuban Rafters by Carles Bosch and Josep M. Domenech
 Cul De Sac: A Suburban War Story by Garrett Scott
 Elsewhere by Nikolaus Geyrhalter
 Family by Sami Saif and Phie Ambo
 Gabriel Orozco by Juan Carlos Martín
 Horns and Halos by Suki Hawley and Michael Galinsky
 Local Angel by Udi Aloni
 Lost in La Mancha by Keith Fulton and Louis Pepe
 My Name Was Sabina Spielrein by Elisabeth Marton
 The Nazi by Rod Lurie
 Neapolitan Heart by Paolo Santoni
 OT: Our Town by Scott Hamilton Kennedy
 Promise Land by Gili Dolev
 Railroad of Hope by Ning Ying
 Spellbound by Jeff Blitz
 Stevie by Steve James
 The Sweatbox by John-Paul Davidson and Trudie Styler
 This Winter by Zhong Hua
 The Trials of Henry Kissinger by Eugene Jarecki
 Winged Migration by Jacques Perrin
 Être et avoir by Nicolas Philibert

Midnight Madness
 Alive by Ryuhei Kitamura
 Bubba Ho-tep by Don Coscarelli
 Cabin Fever by Eli Roth
 The Eye by Oxide Pang and Danny Pang
 MC5: A True Testimonial by David C. Thomas
 My Little Eye by Marc Evans
 Spun by Jonas Åkerlund
 Volcano High by Kim Tae-Kyun

Wavelengths
 The Aperture Of Ghostings: Catherine Street; Creased Robe Smile; Elsa Kirk by Lewis Klahr
 The Art of Fugue by Takashi Ishida
 Bautismo by Casey Koehler
 Counterfeit Film by Brett Simon
 Daylight Moon by Lewis Klahr
 Endless Obsession by Glen Fogel
 Gestalt by Takashi Ishida
 Going Back Home by Louise Bourque
 Gossamer Conglomerate by Courtney Hoskins
 Imaginary Light by Andrew Noren
 Incense by Shiho Kano
 An Injury to One by Travis Wilkerson
 Looking at the Sea by Peter Hutton
 The Man We Want To Hang by Kenneth Anger
 Manual by Christoph Girardet and Matthias Müller
 Munkphilm by Courtney Hoskins
 National Archive: V.1 by Travis Wilkerson
 Puce Moment by Kenneth Anger
 Scratch by Christoph Girardet
 Self Portrait Post Mortem by Louise Bourque
 Swiss Trip by Oskar Fischinger
 Time Being by Andrew Noren
 Ultima Thule by Janie Geiser
 Very and Night Mulch by Stan Brakhage
 Wien & Mozart And Elvis by Jonas Mekas

Canadian Open Vault
 La vraie nature de Bernadette by Gilles Carle

Perspective Canada
 The Baroness and the Pig by Michael Mackenzie
 Blue Skies by Ann Marie Fleming
 Bollywood/Hollywood by Deepa Mehta
 Countdown by Nathan Morlando
 Culture by Donigan Cumming
 Deadend.Com by S. Wyeth Clarkson
 La Dernière voix by Julien Fonfrède and Karim Hussain
 Evelyn: The Cutest Evil Dead Girl by Brad Peyton
 FIX: The Story of an Addicted City by Nettie Wild
 Flower & Garnet by Keith Behrman
 Flux by Christopher Hinton
 Folk by Ryan Feldman
 Gambling, Gods and LSD by Peter Mettler
 Heatscore by Adam Brodie and Dave Derewlany
 Is the Crown at War with Us? by Alanis Obomsawin
 Islands by Richard Fung
 Lighthead by Daniel Sadler
 Little Dickie by Anita McGee
 Lonesome Joe by Mark Sawers
 Long Life, Happiness & Prosperity by Mina Shum
 Marion Bridge by Wiebke von Carolsfeld
 The Marsh by Kim Nguyen
 Moon in the Afternoon by Simon Davidson
 Die Mutter by Cliff Caines
 The Negro by Robert Morin
 Ocean by Catherine Martin
 Once Upon a Time on the Beach by Byron Lamarque
 Past Perfect by Daniel MacIvor
 Perfect Pie by Barbara Willis Sweete
 Prom Fight: The Marc Hall Story by Larry Peloso
 Punch by Guy Bennett
 Rondo pour trompette by Jean-Sebastien Baillat
 Les Rossy by Jennifer Alleyn
 Rub & Tug by Soo Lyu
 S.P.C.E. by Marc Bisaillon
 Saint Monica by Terrance Odette
 Saskatchewan by Brian Stockton
 Shadowy Encounters by Gariné Torossian
 Short Hymn, Silent War by Charles Officer
 Snooze by Stéphane Lafleur
 Song of the Firefly by Izabella Pruska-Oldenhof
 Spring Chickens by Matthew Holm
 The Stone of Folly by Jesse Rosensweet
 Straight in the Face by Peter Demas
 Tom by Mike Hoolboom
 The True Meaning of Pictures: Shelby Lee Adams' Appalachia by Jennifer Baichwal
 Why Don't You Dance? by Michael Downing
 The Wild Dogs by Thom Fitzgerald
 Yellowknife by Rodrigue Jean

Contemporary World Cinema
 24 Heures De La Vie D'Une Femme by Laurent Bouhnik
 Aiki by Daisuke Tengan
 Angela by Roberta Torre
 Autumn Spring by Vladimír Michálek
 BaadAsssss Cinema by Isaac Julien
 Bear's Kiss by Sergei Bodrov
 Bend It Like Beckham by Gurinder Chadha
 The Best of Times by Chang Tso-Chi
 Better Luck Tomorrow by Justin Lin
 Big Shot's Funeral by Feng Xiaogang
 Black and White by Craig Lahiff
 Blue Car by Karen Moncrieff
 Blue Gate Crossing by Yee Chin-yen
 El Bonaerense by Pablo Trapero
 The Crime of Father Amaro by Carlos Carrera
 Cry Woman by Liu Bingjian
 The Cuckoo by Aleksandr Rogozhkin
 Every Day God Kisses Us On The Mouth by Sinişa Dragin
 Falcons by Friðrik Þór Friðriksson
 Fuehrer Ex by Winfried Bonengel
 Gasoline by Monica Stambrini
 The Ghost Of F. Scott Fitzgerald by Charles Lyons
 The Heart of Me by Thaddeus O'Sullivan
 L'Idole by Samantha Lang
 Intacto by Juan Carlos Fresnadillo
 The Intended by Kristian Levring
 Julie Walking Home by Agnieszka Holland
 Kedma by Amos Gitai
 The Kite by Alexei Muradov
 Love Liza by Todd Louiso
 The Lover by Valeriy Todorovskiy
 A Lucky Day by Sandra Gugliotta
 Ma vraie vie à Rouen by Olivier Ducastel and Jacques Martineau
 Madame Satã by Karim Aïnouz
 Never Get Outta the Boat by Paul Quinn
 Nothing More by Juan Carlos Cremata Malberti
 Nowhere in Africa by Caroline Link
 The Nugget by Bill Bennett
 Once Upon a Time in the Midlands by Shane Meadows
 One Night the Moon by Rachel Perkins
 Open Hearts by Susanne Bier
 Une part du ciel by Benedicte Lienard
 Pleasant Days by Kornél Mundruczó
 Poniente by Chus Gutierrez
 Prayer by Jay Rosenblatt
 Pure by Gillies MacKinnon
 Raising Victor Vargas by Peter Sollett
 Real Women Have Curves by Patricia Cardoso
 Reno: Rebel Without A Pause by Nancy Savoca
 Respiro by Emanuele Crialese
 Roger Dodger by Dylan Kidd
 Rosa La China by Valeria Sarmiento
 The Sea by Baltasar Kormákur
 Secretary by Steven Shainberg
 Small Voices by Gil M. Portes
 The Space Between by Chad Lowe
 Springtime in a Small Town by Tian Zhuangzhuang
 Step on It by Sabine Derflinger
 Suddenly by Diego Lerman
 Sur Le Bout Des Doigts by Yves Angelo
 The Three Marias by Aluízio Abranches
 Ticket to Jerusalem by Rashid Masharawi
 A Transistor Love Story by Pen-Ek Ratanaruang
 Tuck Everlasting by Jay Russell
 Tycoon by Pavel Lounguine
 Unknown Pleasures by Jia Zhang-Ke
 The Voice Of The Prophet by Robert Edwards
 Warriors by Daniel Calparsoro
 Welcome to Collinwood by Anthony Russo and Joe Russo
 Wretched Lives by Joel Lamangan

Planet Africa
 Abouna by Mahamat Saleh Haroun
 Ataklan -- Naked Walk by Walt Lovelace
 Black Attack by Walt Lovelace
 Les Chemins de l'Oued by Gaël Morel
 G by Christopher Scott Cherot
 George and the Bicycle Pump by Asha Lovelace
 I Have a Dream by Zak Ove
 Khorma, Enfant Du Cimetiere by Jilani Saadi
 Mud Madness by Walt Lovelace
 Now Jimmy! by Mary Wells
 Promised Land by Jason Xenopoulos
 Rendez-Vous by Mariette Monpierre
 Royal Bonbon by Charles Najman
 Shottas by Cess Silvera
 A String of Pearls by Camille Billops and James V. Hatch
 Ubuntu's Wounds by Sechaba Morojele
 Waiting for Happiness by Abderrahmane Sissako
 Alexei and the Spring by Seiichi Motohashi

National Cinema Lineup - Harvest: South Korean Renaissance
 Bad Guy by Kim Ki-duk
 Camel(s) by Park Ki-yong
 Champion by Kwak Kyung-taek
 Desire by Kim Eung-su
 Oasis by Lee Chang-dong
 Sympathy for Mr. Vengeance by Park Chan-wook
 Take Care of My Cat by Jeong Jae-eun
 Too Young to Die by Park Jin-pyo
 Turning Gate by Hong Sang-soo
 The Way Home by Lee Jeong-hyang

Canadian Retrospective: Allan King
 Children In Conflict Episode: A Talk With Irene by Allan King
 Come On Children by Allan King
 The Dragon's Egg by Allan King
 Dreams by Allan King
 Epilogue by Allan King
 The Field Day by Allan King
 Interview with Orson Welles by Allan King
 Joshua, A Nigerian Portrait by Allan King
 Maria by Allan King
 A Married Couple by Allan King
 A Matter of Pride by Allan King
 Red Emma by Allan King and Martin Kinch
 Rickshaw by Allan King
 Running Away Backwards by Allan King
 Skidrow by Allan King
 Warrendale by Allan King
 Who Has Seen the Wind by Allan King
 Who's in Charge? by Sig Gerber

Spotlight: Robert Guédiguian
 Dernier Été by Robert Guédiguian and Frank Le Wita
 Dieu vomit les tièdes by Robert Guédiguian
 Marie-Jo et ses 2 amours by Robert Guédiguian
 Marius et Jeannette by Robert Guédiguian
 La ville est tranquille by Robert Guédiguian
 À l'attaque! by Robert Guédiguian
 À la Place du Coeur by Robert Guédiguian
 À la vie, à la mort! by Robert Guédiguian

Two Feet, One Angel: A Tribute to Ramiro Puerta
 Contradanza No. 2 by Ramiro Puerta
 Crucero/Crossroads by Ramiro Puerta
 The Lovers of the Arctic Circle by Julio Médem
 Strawberry and Chocolate by Tomás Gutiérrez Alea and Juan Carlos Tabío
 The Topic of Cancer by Ramiro Puerta
 Two Feet, One Angel by Ramiro Puerta
 Exxxorcisms by Jaime Humberto Hermosillo

Canada's Top Ten
TIFF named its annual Canada's Top Ten list in early 2003.

Ararat by Atom Egoyan
Chaos and Desire by Manon Briand
Dracula: Pages from a Virgin's Diary by Guy Maddin
Flower & Garnet by Keith Behrman
Gambling, Gods and LSD by Peter Mettler
Marion Bridge by Wiebke von Carolsfeld
The Negro by Robert Morin
Ocean by Catherine Martin
Spider by David Cronenberg
Tom by Mike Hoolboom

References

External links
 Official site
 2002 Toronto International Film Festival at IMDb

2002 film festivals
2002
2002 in Toronto
2002 in Canadian cinema
2002 festivals in North America